Malkerson Island is a private island on Bay Lake, a lake that is located in Bay Lake Township, Crow Wing County, Minnesota. The island is owned by the Malkerson family and has been used as a summertime weekend retreat for five generations. The island has been featured in the New York Times and Star Tribune.

References 

Landforms of Crow Wing County, Minnesota
Lake islands of Minnesota
Private islands of the United States